Chokhuha (also Romanized as Chokhūhā; also known as Choghūhā, Chūkhehhā, and Qal‘eh-e Mūdū) is a village in Howmeh Rural District, in the Central District of Lamerd County, Fars Province, Iran. At the 2006 census, its population was 92, in 23 families.

References 

Populated places in Lamerd County